Sporting Lagos FC is a professional football club in Lagos founded in 2022. They play in the second tier of the Nigeria football league system: the Nigeria National league.

References 

Football clubs in Lagos
Nigeria National League
Association football clubs established in 2022